Lerty is an unincorporated community in Westmoreland County, in the U. S. state of Virginia.

Stratford Hall Plantation, a National Historic Landmark and birthplace of Confederate general Robert E. Lee, is located near the community.

References

Unincorporated communities in Virginia
Unincorporated communities in Westmoreland County, Virginia